Marquês de Sapucaí may refer to: 

 Sambadrome Marquês de Sapucaí, the Sambadrome in Rio de Janeiro, Brazil
 Cândido José de Araújo Viana, Marquis of Sapucaí (1793-1875), a Brazilian writer